The Zauner OZ-5 One-Yankee is an American high-wing, T-tailed, single seat, 15 metre class glider that was designed and constructed by Otto Zauner.

Design and development
Zauner designed a new fuselage and tail surfaces to mate with a set of Schreder RS-15 wings that he had built, producing a new aircraft.

The stock RS-15 wings of  span are built from foam and sheet aluminium and feature flaps and a Schreder 1 airfoil, which is a modified Wortmann section. The fuselage consists of a welded steel tube cockpit cage, surrounded by a fiberglass shell. The rear fuselage is tapered and is made from sheet aluminium, as are the tail surfaces. The fin is highly swept and mounts the tailplane and elevators in T-tail configuration. The wings are carefully faired into the fuselage using integral fuselage fillets. The landing gear is a retractable monowheel.

Only one OZ-5 was built and it was registered in 1974 with the Federal Aviation Administration in the Experimental - Amateur-built category.

Operational history
The designer completed two diamond badge legs in the OZ-5. As of July 2011 the aircraft remained on the FAA registry, still owned by Zauner.

Specifications (OZ-5)

See also

References

1970s United States sailplanes
Homebuilt aircraft